Evne Webber, alternatively Erné Webber, (born 1 June 1977) is a South African former cricketer who played as a right-handed batter and right-arm off break bowler. She appeared in one One Day International for South Africa in 1999, against New Zealand. She played domestic cricket for Eastern Province.

References

External links
 
 

1977 births
Living people
Cricketers from Port Elizabeth
South African women cricketers
South Africa women One Day International cricketers
Eastern Province women cricketers